Izatha quinquejacula is a species of moth in the family Oecophoridae. It is endemic to New Zealand. This species is classified as "At Risk, Naturally Uncommon" by the Department of Conservation. It is only found on the Three Kings Islands.

Taxonomy and etymology 
This species was first described by Robert J. B. Hoare in 2010. It was first discovered by Peter M. Johns  in 1963. The epithet comes from the Latin words quinque, meaning five, and jaculum, meaning a javelin or dart. This refers to the maximum of five deciduous cornuti in the vesica, one of the diagnostic characters of the species.

Description 
The wingspan of this species is 19–23 mm for males and about 26 mm for females. The species is similar in appearance to I. epiphanes, I. mesoschista, and I. haumu. However I. quinquejacula can be distinguished from I. epiphanes as it has a less noticeable discal spot as well as a fishtail shaped mark above this spot on its forewings.  It can be distinguished from  I. mesoschista, and I. haumu. as it has a 3 shaped black mark on the main vein running along the leading edge of its wing which is not found on the forewings of those two species.

Distribution 
This species is endemic to New Zealand. It is only found on the Great Island in the Three Kings Islands.

Biology and behaviour 
Little is known of the biology of this species and the larvae are as yet unknown. Adults have been recorded on the wing in November and December.

Conservation Status 
This species has been classified as having the "At Risk, Naturally Uncommon" conservation status under the New Zealand Threat Classification System.

References

Oecophorinae
Moths described in 2010
Moths of New Zealand
Endemic fauna of New Zealand
Endangered biota of New Zealand
Endemic moths of New Zealand